Buddy Greene (born October 30, 1953) is an American singer, songwriter, guitar player and harmonica player. Most of his recordings consist of gospel music with a distinctly Southern gospel flavor. Much of his music is influenced by country music and bluegrass music. Greene grew up in Macon, Georgia. He has written the music for many songs and also co-wrote the Christmas song "Mary, Did You Know?" with Mark Lowry; Greene also wrote "Recovering Pharisee" recorded by Del McCoury, and "He Is" recorded by Ashley Cleveland. He is considered a harmonica legend by many, and once played a classical harmonica medley at Carnegie Hall.

Discography 
Praise You, Lord (Fortress) - 1986
Praise Harmonica (Fortress) - 1987
Slice of Life (Fortress)
Sojourner's Song (Word) - 1990
Grace for the Moment - 1994
Buddy Greene & Friends Live (Fortress) - 1992
Minstrel of the Lord (Fortress) - 1995
Simple Praise (Fortress) - 1996
Christmas …Not Just Any Night - 1998
Re: Sinners & Saints (Ministry Music) - 2000
Rufus (Rufus) - 2002
Pilgrimage: A Collection of Favorites (Spring Hill)
*Hymns and Prayer Songs (Spring Hill Music) - 2004
Happy Man (Rufus) - 2007
A Few More Years - 2009
The Best of Buddy Greene: From the Homecoming Series (Gaither Music Group) - 2010
Harmonica Anthology (Rufus) - 2011
December's Song - 2013
Someday - 2016
Looking Back (Rufus) - 2017

Charts

References

External links 
Homepage
"Classical Medley" by Buddy Greene (Harmonica)
Buddy Greene harmonica performance at Carnegie Hall, standing ovation

1953 births
Living people
American gospel singers
American harmonica players
Musicians from Macon, Georgia
Southern gospel performers